The Caguana Ceremonial Ball Courts Site (often referred to as Caguana Site) is an archaeological site located in Caguana, Utuado in Puerto Rico, considered to be one of the most important Pre-Columbian sites in the West Indies. The site is known for its well-preserved ceremonial ball courts and petroglyph-carved monoliths. Studies estimate the in-situ courts to be over 700 years old, built by the Taíno around 1270 AD.

Overview 
Approximately 13 ball courts and plazas (bateyes) have been identified and many have been restored to their original state. Monoliths and petroglyphs carved by the Taínos can be seen among the rocks and stones, some weighing over a ton, that were most likely brought from the Tanama River located adjacent to the site.

The plan of the site and the positions of the ball courts indicate an alignment with specific astronomical events, and the site might have functioned as a place to observe and possibly predict astronomical events such as planetary and stellar transits, conjunctions and alignments. Numerous of the petroglyphs depict astronomical objects such as the moon, stars and planets. Although the site is not listed as a world heritage site, its archaeoastronomical features are well-documented and recognized by the UNESCO Astronomy and World Heritage Initiative.

History 
The site of the modern archaeological site was originally known as Corrales de los Indios (Spanish for "Indian corrals") by locals after the corral-like outlines of some of the ball courts. The first exploration and survey works in the site were led by American anthropologist John Alden Mason in 1914. The site has been under continuous study since the 1930s, at first by archaeologists from Yale University such as Irvin Rouse, and later by the Institute of Puerto Rican Culture and Dr. Ricardo Alegría. The interpretative park and a small museum were first opened to visitors in 1965.

Designations 
The Institute of Puerto Rican Culture manages the site as a park under the name Caguana Indigenous Ceremonial Center. The National Park Service has placed it on the National Register of Historic Places, and designated it as a National Historic Landmark (under the name Caguana Site). It was listed on the National Register in 1992 and designated a U.S. National Historic Landmark in 1993.

The park also includes a small museum containing Taíno artifacts, archaeological exhibits and a small botanical garden featuring some of the plants the Taínos harvested for food such as sweet potatoes, cassava, corn, and yautía. Many of the trees used by the Taínos to construct their homes (bohíos), such as mahogany and ceiba can also be seen throughout the park.

Also the site has been included in the UNESCO Astronomy World Heritage List.

Gallery
Scenes at Caguana Ceremonial Ball Courts Site:

See also

List of United States National Historic Landmarks in United States commonwealths and territories, associated states, and foreign states
National Register of Historic Places listings in central Puerto Rico
Tibes Indigenous Ceremonial Center

References

External links

 
 
 Centro Ceremonial Indígena de Caguana, Utuado - Puerto Rican Cultural Institute
 National Park Service site description for visitors
 National Historic Landmark description by the National Park Service
 Parque Ceremonial Indigena de Caguana Official Page
Summary sheet from the Puerto Rico State Historic Preservation Office 

Properties of religious function on the National Register of Historic Places in Puerto Rico
National Historic Landmarks in Puerto Rico
Pre-Columbian archaeological sites
Native American museums in Puerto Rico
Museums in Utuado, Puerto Rico
Petroglyphs in Puerto Rico
13th-century establishments in Puerto Rico
Archaeological sites on the National Register of Historic Places in Puerto Rico
Sports venues in Puerto Rico
Sports venues on the National Register of Historic Places